The Billboard Hot 100 is a chart that ranks the best-performing singles of the United States. Its data, published by Billboard magazine and compiled by Nielsen SoundScan, is based collectively on each single's weekly physical and digital sales, as well as airplay and streaming. At the end of a year, Billboard will publish an annual list of the 100 most successful songs throughout that year on the Hot 100 chart based on the information. For 2018, the list was published on December 4, calculated with data from December 2, 2017 to November 17, 2018.

The top Hot 100 artist of 2018 was Drake, who placed eight songs on the list, including the number-one song of the year, "God's Plan". Rapper Cardi B also placed eight songs on the list.

The 2018 Billboard Year End list is also notable for being one of five Billboard Year-End lists that featured 14 songs that appeared in the previous year (in this case 2017's) repeat onto to this list. With the highest being Camila Cabello's "Havana", barely making it onto 2017's list at number 96 and repeating much higher at number 4 in 2018's. Only four more year-end list would repeat the same feat, that being 1997, 2010, 2016 and 2022.

Year-end list

See also
 2018 in American music
 List of Billboard Hot 100 number ones of 2018
 List of Billboard Hot 100 top-ten singles in 2018

References

United States Hot 100 Year end
Billboard charts
2018 in American music